Sulayman Yusuf Ali (Koore) is a Somali politician and former military officer who is presently serving as Somaliland's Minister of Information and National Guidance.President Muse Bihi Abdi appointed Koore as Minister of Water Resources for Somaliland in 2017. Koore also served as Minister of Agriculture under President Egal's administration and also thirteen years as a member of parliament of Somaliland.

See also

 Minister of Information and National Guidance
 Ministry of Water Resources (Somaliland)
 Parliament of Somaliland
 List of Somaliland politicians
 List of Somali politicians

References

|-

Peace, Unity, and Development Party politicians
Government ministers of Somaliland
Living people
Somaliland Representative Offices
1965 births